Events from the year 1996 in art.

Events
8 January – Shortly after publication of the Italian edition of his book The Art Forger's Handbook, English-born art forger Eric Hebborn is found lying in a street in Rome, his skull crushed with a blunt instrument; he dies in hospital on 11 January.
15 March – Arken Museum of Modern Art in Copenhagen, designed by Søren Robert Lund, opens.
November – Museum für Gegenwart (contemporary art museum) in former Hamburger Bahnhof in Berlin, converted by Josef Paul Kleihues, opens.
Gallery of Modern Art in Glasgow opens.
Museum Tinguely in Basel, designed by Mario Botta, opens.
For an exhibition at the de Appel Arts Center in Amsterdam, Maurizio Cattelan steals the entire contents of another artist's show from a nearby gallery with the idea of passing it off as his own work, Another Fucking Readymade, until the police insist he return the items on threat of arrest.

Awards
Archibald Prize – Wendy Sharpe, Self Portrait as Diana of Erskineville
Jan Amos Comenius Medal (UNESCO) – Yaacov Agam, for the "Agam Method" for visual education of young children
 The Inaugural Hugo Boss Prize – Matthew Barney
Turner Prize – Douglas Gordon
Wynne Prize – William Robinson, Creation landscape – earth and sea

Exhibitions
British Art Show 5 – various venues in Manchester
Sol LeWitt Prints: 1970–1995 – travelling exhibition by the Museum of Modern Art, New York.
Vermeer – nearly complete exhibition of 25 works, The Hague and Metropolitan Museum of Art, New York.

Works

Stephen Antonakos – The Room Chapel (mixed media sculpture)
George Beasley – Five Points Monument (Atlanta)
Robert Calvo – Ascension (sculpture, Portland, Oregon)
Maurizio Cattelan – Bidibidobidiboo (sculpture)
Angela Conner – Rising Universe (water sculpture)
Paul DiPasquale – The Arthur Ashe Monument on Monument Avenue in Richmond, Virginia
Raymond Kaskey – Gateway of Dreams (Atlanta)
David LaChapelle – "Alexander McQueen and Isabella Blow"
Roy Lichtenstein – Brushstrokes (sculpture, Portland, Oregon)
Liza Lou – Kitchen's (completed)
Ron Mueck – Big Baby, Mongrel and Pinocchio (sculptures
Alexander Stoddart – Ossian: in memoriam James Macpherson 1736–96'' (bronze head)

Films

Basquiat

Deaths

January to June
3 January – Terence Cuneo, English railway and military painter (b. 1907).
6 January – Duane Hanson, American sculptor (b. 1925).
9 January – Félix González-Torres, Cuban artist (b. 1957).
11 January – Eric Hebborn, English-born art forger (b. 1934).
11 February – Pierre Edouard Leopold Verger, French photographer and ethnographer (b. 1902).
18 January – Leonor Fini, Argentine-born surrealist painter (b. 1908).
28 January – Jerry Siegel, American comic book artist (b. 1914).
20 February – Audrey Munson, American actress and artist's model (b. 1891).
5 March – Joshua Compston, British gallerist (b. 1970).
15 March – Helen Chadwick, British artist (b. 1953).
14 April – Mervyn Levy, Welsh-born art critic and artist (b. 1914).
25 April – Saul Bass, American graphic designer and Academy Award-winning filmmaker (b. 1920).
7 May – William Copley, American artist (b. 1919).
10 June – Marie-Louise von Motesiczky, Austrian painter (b. 1906).

July to December
17 July - Rico Puhlmann, German  photographer (b. 1934).
28 July – Roger Tory Peterson, American naturalist, ornithologist, artist and educator (b. 1908).
27 August – Abram Games, English poster artist (b. 1914).
24 October – Lin Onus, Scottish-Aboriginal Koori artist (b. 1948).
22 November – Edmund Teske, American photographer (b. 1911).
26 November – Paul Rand, American graphic designer (b. 1914).
29 November – Dan Flavin, American minimalist artist (b. 1933).
3 December – Jean Tabaud, French artist (b. 1914).
11 December – Willie Rushton, English cartoonist, satirist, comedian, actor and performer (b. 1937).
16 December – Quentin Bell, English art historian and author (b. 1910).
25 December – Gabriel Loire, French stained glass artist (b. 1904).

References

 
Years of the 20th century in art
1990s in art